Aleksander Stern (born 6 January 1948 in Kuressaare) is an Estonian physician and politician. He was a member of the VIII and IX Riigikogu.

Stern's father, Károly Stern, moved to Estonia from Hungary in 1935 and was a long-time director of the Tallinn Zoo. He graduated from Tartu State University's Department of Medicine in 1972.

References

Living people
1948 births
Estonian physicians
Estonian politicians
Members of the Riigikogu, 1995–1999
Members of the Riigikogu, 1999–2003
University of Tartu alumni
Estonian people of Hungarian descent
People from Kuressaare